The King v. Arundel (officially Rex and the Lord Hunsdon v The Countess of Arundel, and the Lord William Howard), 80 ER 268 (K.B. 1617), [1616] EWHC Ch J11, (1617) Hobart 109 was a notable case in English Law that established the enrolled bill rule. 

The case held that the only valid record of an Act of Parliament was that which had been "delivered into chancery," (that is, the final approved Act) and that it is conclusive as to the regularity of its enactment. Following this case, the law was established that the regularity of the process by which the Act was drawn up cannot be challenged in court. Nor can the law that existed before the new law be used to qualify or modify the approved Act. "Nothing turns upon what the law was before the statute."

References

Legal history of England
Court of King's Bench (England) cases
1617 in law
1617 in England